Douw Gerbrandt Grobler (born 6 February 1992) is a South African rugby union player, who plays for Sharks (Currie Cup). His regular position is lock.

Career

Youth

Grobler then moved to Cape Town to join . He played for the  team in the 2011 Under-19 Provincial Championship and for the  team in the 2012 and 2013 Under-21 Provincial Championships.

Western Province / Stormers

He made a further six appearances as a reserve in the remainder of the tournament, but then suffered an ankle injury that ruled him out of the play-off stages, as well as the majority of the 2014 season.

He also played off the bench in the final, helping  win the title by beating the  19–16.

Drugs ban

In February 2015, it was revealed that Grobler received a two-year ban from the sport after failing a drugs test. The South African Institute for Drug Free Sport confirmed that Grobler tested positively for the anabolic steroid drostanolone after a match in October 2014 during the 2014 Currie Cup Premier Division. Grobler admitted his guilt and received a ban for two years, effective until October 2016.

Racing 92
After Grobler's serving his two-year ban, Grobler left South Africa to sign for top French club Racing 92 in the Top 14 for the 2016–17 season.

Munster

In July 2017, it was announced that Grobler had joined Irish Pro14 side Munster on a one-year contract. On 24 August 2017, Grobler made his non-competitive debut for Munster when he started alongside compatriot Jean Kleyn against Worcester Warriors in a pre-season friendly in Sixways Stadium. During the game, Grobler suffered an ankle injury which he subsequently had to undergo surgery for. He was ruled out until early 2018. Grobler finally made his competitive debut for Munster on 10 February 2018, coming off the bench in the provinces' 33–5 win against Zebre in the 2017–18 Pro14.

Gloucester

Grobler joined English Premiership side Gloucester ahead of the 2018–19 season.

Stade Français
Grobler returned to the Top 14 with Stade Français on a two-year contract ahead of the 2020–21 season.

References

External links
Munster Profile
Pro14 Profile
EPCR Profile 
Gloucester Profile

South African rugby union players
Western Province (rugby union) players
Stormers players
Living people
1992 births
Rugby union locks
People from Mbombela
Doping cases in rugby union
Munster Rugby players
Gloucester Rugby players
Stade Français players
South African expatriate rugby union players
Expatriate rugby union players in France
South African expatriate sportspeople in France
Racing 92 players
Sharks (Currie Cup) players
Sharks (rugby union) players
Rugby union players from Mpumalanga